Apulia, also known by its Italian name Puglia, is a region of Italy, located in the southern peninsular section of the country, bordering the Adriatic Sea to the east, the Ionian Sea to the southeast and the Strait of Otranto and Gulf of Taranto to the south. The region comprises , and its population is about four million people.

It is bordered by the other Italian regions of Molise to the north, Campania to the west, and Basilicata to the southwest. Its chief town is Bari.

Geography

Apulia's coastline is longer than that of any other mainland Italian region. In the north, the Gargano promontory extends out into the Adriatic sea like a 'sperone' ("spur"), while in the south, the Salento peninsula forms the 'tacco' ("heel") of Italy's boot. The highest peak in the region is Monte Cornacchia (1.152 m/3.779 ft above sea level) within the Daunian Mountains, in the north along the Apennines.

It is home to two national parks, the Alta Murgia National Park and Gargano National Park.

Outside national parks in the North and West, most of Apulia and particularly the Salento peninsula is geographically flat with only moderate hills.

The climate is typically Mediterranean with hot, dry and sunny summers and mild and rainy winters. Snowfall, especially on the coast is rare but has occurred as recently as January 2019 (following on from snow in March 2018 and January 2017). Apulia is among the hottest and driest regions of Italy in summer with temperatures sometimes reaching up to and above 40 °C/104 °F in Lecce and Foggia.

The coastal areas, particularly on the Adriatic sea and in the southern Salento peninsula, are frequently exposed to winds of varying strengths and directions, strongly affecting local temperatures and conditions, sometimes within the same day. The Northerly Bora wind from the Adriatic sea can lower temperatures, humidity and moderate summer heat while the Southerly Sirocco wind from North Africa can raise temperatures, humidity and occasionally drop red dust from the Sahara desert. On some days in spring and autumn/fall, it can be warm enough to swim in Gallipoli and Porto Cesareo on the Ionian coast while at the same time, cool winds warrant jackets and jumpers/sweaters in Monopoli and Otranto on the Adriatic coast.

The area that is in between Otranto and Santa Maria di Leuca is part of the Regional Natural Coastal Park of "Costa Otranto - Santa Maria di Leuca e Bosco di Tricase" wanted by the Apulia Region in 2008. This territory has numerous natural and historical attractions such as Ciolo, which is a rocky cove.

History

Apulia is one of the richest archaeological regions in Italy. It was first colonized by Mycenaean Greeks.

The Greeks referred to the region as Iapygía (whence 'Apulia') owing to the presence of the three main Iapygian tribes  that inhabited Apulia during the first millennium B.C. – the Daunians in the North, the Peucetians in the Centre, and the Messapians in the South.

Some parts of the regions were conquered by the Muslim Saracens and the Emirate of Bari was established for a brief period of time by Muhammad Abul Abbas of Sicily.

A number of castles were built in the area by the King of Sicily and Holy Roman Emperor Frederick II, including Castel del Monte, sometimes called the "Crown of Apulia".

Apulia was an autonomous duchy until 1130 when its duke became king of Sicily. After 1282, when the kingdom lost the island of Sicily itself, Apulia remained part of the remnant Kingdom of Naples (confusingly known also as the Kingdom of Sicily), and remained so until the unification of Italy in 1861. This kingdom was independent under the House of Anjou from 1282 to 1442, then was part of Aragon until 1458, after which it was again independent under a cadet branch of the House of Trastámara until 1501. As a result of the French–Spanish war of 1501–1504, Naples again came under the rule of Aragon and the Spanish Empire from 1504 to 1714. When Barbary pirates of North Africa sacked Vieste in 1554, they took an estimated 7,000 slaves. The coast of Apulia was occupied at times by the Turks and at other times by the Venetians.

In 1861 the region became part of the Kingdom of Italy.

Economy
The region's contribution to Italy's gross value added was around 4.6% in 2000, while its population was 7% of the total. The per capita GDP is low compared to the national average and represents about 68.1% of the EU average.

The share of gross value added by the agricultural and services sectors was above the national average in 2000. The region has industries specialising in particular areas, including food processing and vehicles in Foggia; footwear and textiles in the Barletta province, and wood and furniture in the Murge area to the west.

Between 2007 and 2013 the economy of Apulia expanded more than that of the rest of southern Italy. Such growth, over several decades, is a severe challenge to the hydrogeological system.

Apulia's thriving economy is articulated into numerous sectors boasting several leading companies, but most of them produce materials or components, not finished goods: 
 Aerospace (Leonardo, Avio Aero, Sitael, Blackshape) 
 Automotive (Bosch, Magneti Marelli, Magna Gertrag, Bridgestone)
 Mechanics (New Holland Construction, IVECO Motori, Isotta Fraschini Motori, MERMEC) 
 Furniture (Natuzzi)
 Food and Beverage (De Carlo, Divella,  Quarta Caffé)
 Agriculture (Casillo Group, G.C. Partecipazioni) 
 Publishing  (Laterza, Edizioni Dedalo)
 Tourism (Nicolaus tour)
 Logistics (GTS Rail)
 I.C.T. (Exprivia)

In Taranto there is the largest metallurgical works ILVA Acciaierie di Taranto (8,200 empl.) in Europe with full iron and steel production cycle. It will be sold to Arcelor Mittal.

In Brindisi there is a chemical industrial park with ENI power station, ENI oil refinery, Syndial chemical factory, Versalis chemical factory (basic chemistry, intermediates, polyethylene, styrenics and elastomers). LyondellBasell polypropylene plant, Sanofi plant (antibiotics). Other ENI oil refinery is located in Taranto.

Unemployment 
The unemployment rate stood at 14.1% in 2020.

Fishing and aquaculture
The port of Taranto hosts numerous fishing boats. The fleet is mainly made up of about 80 fishing boats, which do not exceed 10 gross tonnage and which practice trawling, while the remaining small-scale fishing boats operate with gillnets. The sea, rich and generous, is populated by dentex and sea bream, grouper, mullet and anchovies, shrimp and squid. Other significant fishing ports are
Manfredonia, Molfetta, Mola di Bari, Monopoli, Gallipoli and Castro

Today Taranto is the world's largest producer of farmed mussels: with 1,300 employees, around 30,000 tons of mussels are processed per year. Mussel farming has characterized the city's economy for centuries, making the mussel the gastronomic symbol of Taranto. It is said that the first mussel gardens in La Spezia, Pula, Olbia and Chioggia were established by mussel farmers who emigrated from this city. The work place of the Taranto mussel farmers is the boat; every detail of the working method has improved over time.

10 m long structures made of wood or metal, called "pali" (piles), are attached to the seabed, to which ropes and nets are then attached, on which the mussels are grown. The mussels farmed here are particularly tasty and valued because they grow in a special environment, a mixture of salt seawater and karst freshwater. These special environmental conditions of the seas of Taranto are ideal not only for the mussels, but also for the fish and crustaceans that find food and shelter between the piles. While there are around 18 submarine freshwater springs, called "Citri", in the Mar Piccolo, there is only one large one in the Mar Grande, which is called "Anello di San Cataldo" in honor of the patron saint of the city.

Agriculture
Agriculture plays a prominent economic role in Apulia. It is a mainly intensive and modern agriculture that allows the region to be among the first in Italy for the production of many products:
 durum wheat which is used to produce pasta
 tomatoes
 grape
 almonds
 olive oil

Vegetable growing (lettuce, artichoke, fennel, cabbage, celery, barattiere, borage, sweet potato, caper, portulaca) and horticulture (kiwis, peaches, orange, clementine, lemon) are also developed.

Viticulture

Vineyards cover  in Apulia, which is 1st place among Italian grape-growing regions. But in the production of quality DOC and DOCG wines, Apulia has only ranked 12th of 20 with 297.667 hl. There are four DOCG wines:
 Castel del Monte Bombino Nero 
 Castel del Monte Nero di Troia Riserva
 Castel del Monte Rosso Riserva 
 Primitivo di Manduria Dolce Naturale

Oliviculture

There are an estimated 50 to 60 million olive trees in Apulia, and the region accounts for 40% of Italy's olive oil production. There are four specific Protected Designation of Origin (PDO) covering the whole region. Olive varieties include: Baresane, Biancolilla, Brandofino (Castiglione), Buscionetto (Biancolilla), Carolea, Cellina di Nardò, Cerasuola (Ogliara), Cerignola (Bella di Cerignola), Cima di Bitonto, Cima di Mola, Coratina, also grown in Corning, California, a 2018 Gold Medal New York International Olive Oil Competition (NYIOOC) winner, Frantoio, Garganica, La Minuta, Leccino, Moresca, Nocellara Etnea, Nocellara Messinese, Ogliarola, Ogliarola Barese, Ogliara Messinese, Ottobratica, Peranzana, Rotondella, Santagatese, Saracena, Tonda Iblea, and Verdello (subspecies of San Benedetto).

Xylella fastidiosa disease
Since 2008–2010, the olive oil industry in Apulia has been under threat from the pathogen Xylella fastidiosa, a disease that inhibits the trees' uptake of water and nutrients. The epicenter of the epidemic is the south-eastern part of the region.

Transport

The region has a good network of roads, but the railway network is less comprehensive, particularly in the south. There are no high-speed lines. The region is crossed northwest to southeast by the A14 highway (Bologna–Taranto), which connects the region capital, Bari, to Taranto, the second most populous city in the region. The A14 also connects Foggia and points further north along the Adriatic coast to: Pescara, Ancona, Rimini and eventually Bologna. The only other highway in the region is the A16 (Naples–Canosa), which crosses the Italian peninsula east–west and links the region with Naples.

There are two international airports, Karol Wojtyla Airport in Bari (IATA: BRI) and Brindisi Airport (IATA: BDS), which serves as the principal logistical hub for the United Nations Global Service Center headquartered in Brindisi. With the approval of a redevelopment project in 2018, the Grottaglie Airfield (IATA: TAR) will host a spaceport for the Italian Space Agency and Virgin Galactic.

Demographics

Emigration from the region's depressed areas to northern Italy and the rest of Europe was very intense in the years between 1956 and 1971. Subsequently, the trend declined, as economic conditions improved, to the point where there was net immigration in the years between 1982 and 1985. Since 1986 the stagnation in employment has led to a new inversion of the trend, caused by a decrease in immigration.

Government and politics

Since 1 June 2015, former judge and mayor of Bari, Michele Emiliano of the Democratic Party has served as President of the Apulian region.

Culture

Cuisine

Important locally produced ingredients include olive oil, artichokes, tomatoes, eggplant, asparagus, and various kinds of seafood. Local specialties include the carosello, a variety of muskmelon which is often consumed when unripe. Apulian Protected designation of origin (PDO) and Protected geographical indication (PGI) products included cheeses, olive oils, fruits and vegetables, and a type of bread.

Typically Apulian pasta shapes are Orecchiette, Cavatelli, and Troccoli. Popular street foods include panzerotti, sgagliozze (Fried Polenta), popizze (small fried balls of pizza dough that are sometimes also called pettule), rustici (puff pastries stuffed with tomatoes, bechamel sauce, mozzarella, and black pepper), the famous pasticiotto (a flaky short bread dough filled with custard), and focaccia barese. A popular snack in Apulia are Taralli.

Language
As with the other regions of Italy, the national language (since 1861) is Italian. However, because of its long and varied history, other historical languages have been used in this region for centuries. The local languages of northern and central Apulia (roughly the provinces of Bari, Barletta-Andria-Trani, and Foggia as well as the northwestern parts of the Province of Taranto) are the Apulian Southern Italo-Romance dialects, including Bari dialect and Tarantino dialect. In the southern region of Salento, an extreme Southern Italo-Romance language, the Salentino dialect is widely spoken. There is also an Italiot Greek language found in Salento called Griko, which is still spoken by a few thousand Griko people in some areas. In addition, a rare daughter language of the Franco-Provençal language called Faetar, is spoken in the mountain villages of Faeto and Celle di San Vito, in the Province of Foggia. It is sometimes classified as a pair of dialects of Franco-Provençal, Faetar and Cellese. The Arbëreshë dialect of the Albanian language has been spoken by a small community since refugees settled there in the 16thcentury.

Sports
Apulia is home to several national football, water polo, volleyball, basketball and tennis clubs.

Across the top 3 levels of Italian football, the clubs in Apulia include:
 U.S. Lecce playing in Serie A
 S.S.C. Bari playing in Serie B
 Calcio Foggia 1920 playing in Serie C
 S.S. Audace Cerignola playing in Serie C
 Fidelis Andria 2018 playing in Serie C
 S.S. Monopoli 1966 playing in Serie C
 Virtus Francavilla Calcio playing in Serie C
 Taranto F.C. 1927 playing in Serie C

See also
 Catepanate of Italy
 Gravina in Puglia
 Daunian Mountains
 Gargano
 Grecia Salentina
 Iapygians
 Magna Graecia
 Messapians
 Sacra Corona Unita
 Salento
 Tavoliere delle Puglie
 Terra d'Otranto
 Trullo

Explanatory notes

References

Further reading

Desmond Seward, An Armchair Traveller's History of Apulia (Haus Publishing, 2013)
Stefania Mola, Apulia: the Cathedrals (Adda, 2008)
Francesco Carofiglio, Apulia, a Tourist's Guide to the Culture of Apulia (1988)
Susanna Gelmetti, Italian Country Cooking: Recipes from Umbria & Apulia (1996), 
Apulia: A Film Tourism Guide (Laterza, 2009, 246 pp)
Tessa Garton, Early Romanesque Sculpture in Apulia (Courtauld Institute, 1984)

External links
 
 Official website 
 Accademia Apulia 
 Environmental League Puglia 
 All About Puglia 
 The Big Gay Podcast from Puglia 

 
Coloniae (Roman)
NUTS 2 statistical regions of the European Union
Regions of Italy
Wine regions of Italy